Carl Wheeler may refer to:
Carl Wheeler, a member of Tony! Toni! Toné!
Jordan Carl Wheeler Davis (born 1988), American singer
Carl Wheeler Rand, father of Robert Wheeler Rand
Carl Wheezer, a character in Jimmy Neutron: Boy Genius and its sequel The Adventures of Jimmy Neutron: Boy Genius